Hashim (Arabic/Persian: هاشم), better known as al-Muqanna‘ ( "The Veiled", died c. 783.) was leader of an anti Islamic revolt who claimed to be a prophet, and founded a religion which was a mixture of Zoroastrianism and Islam. He was a chemist, and one of his experiments caused an explosion in which a part of his face was burnt. For the rest of his life he used a veil and thus was known as "al-Muqanna‘ ("The Veiled One"). Said Nafisi and Amir-Hossein Aryanpour have written about him in the "Khorrām-Dīnān" armies.

Name and early life 
Before he came to be known by the nickname of "al-Muqanna‘, he was called by his birth name, Hashim. Early scholars believed that he was born in Sogdia. However, it is now agreed that he originally came from Balkh, a city close to Sogdia in modern day northern Afghanistan.

Biography 
Of Iranian stock, Hāshem was from Balkh, originally a clothes pleater. He became a commander for Abu Muslim of the Greater Khorasan province of Iran or (Persia). After Abu Muslim's murder in 755 AD, Hashem claimed to be the incarnation of God.  Hāshem was reputed to wear a veil in order to cover up his beauty, whereas his followers wore white clothes in opposition to Abbasid rulers' black. He is reputed to have engaged in magic and miracles in order to gain followers.

Hāshem was instrumental in the formation of the Khorrām-Dīnān armies which were led by Pāpak Khorram-Din. This was an uprising of Persians aimed at overthrowing the ruling Arabs. When Hāshem's followers started raiding towns and mosques of other Muslims and looting their possessions, the Abbasids sent several commanders to crush the rebellion. Hāshem chose to poison himself rather than surrender to the Abbasids, who had set fire to his house. Hāshem died eventually in a Persian fort near Kesh. After his death, the Khorrām-Dīnān armies existed until the 12th century.

Cultural references 
In 1787 Napoleon Bonaparte wrote a two-page short story about Al-Muqanna called "Le Masque prophète".

The first poem in Lalla-Rookh (1817) by Thomas Moore is titled The Veiled Prophet of Khorassan, and the character Mokanna is modeled loosely on al-Muqanna‘. An 1877 opera, The Veiled Prophet by Charles Villiers Stanford, is in turn loosely based on the story of Mokanna as given in Lalla-Rookh.

St. Louis businessmen referenced Moore's poem in 1878 when they created the Veiled Prophet Organization and concocted a legend of Mokanna as its founder.
For many years the organization put on an annual fair and parade called the "Veiled Prophet Fair", which was renamed Fair Saint Louis in 1992.  The organization also gave a debutante ball each December called the Veiled Prophet Ball.

The Mystic Order of Veiled Prophets of the Enchanted Realm (founded 1889), often known as "the Grotto", a social group with membership restricted to Master Masons, and its female auxiliary, the Daughters of Mokanna (founded 1919), also take their names from Thomas Moore's poem.

Argentine writer Jorge Luis Borges used a fictionalized al-Muqanna‘ as the central character of The Masked Dyer, Hakim of Merv, a 1934 short story, and in another story fifteen years later, The Zahir, as a past avatar of the titular object.

Sax Rohmer used the legend of el Mokanna as the background for his 1934 novel, The Mask of Fu Manchu.

Iranian film director Khosrow Sinai has a film script about al-Muqanna entitled Sepidjāmeh. Filmnāmeh (The Man in White) published in Tehran in 2000.

The rebellion of Al-Muqanna is part of the historical novel "Mille et dix mille pas", by Anne and Laurent Champs-Massart.

See also 
 Bihafarid
 Ustadh Sis
 Mazdak
 Khurramites
 Sunpadh
 Ishaq al-Turk
 Babak Khorramdin
 Afshin
 Maziar
 Al-Mubarqa
 M.O.V.P.E.R.
 Veiled Prophet Ball

References

Sources 
 M. S. Asimov, C. E. Bosworth u.a.: History of Civilizations of Central Asia. Band IV: The Age of Achievement. AD 750 to the End of the Fifteenth Century. Part One: The Historical, Social and Economic Setting. Paris 1998.
 Patricia Crone: The Nativist Prophets of Early Islamic Iran. Rural Revolt and Local Zoroastrianism. Cambridge: Cambridge University Press 2012. S. 106-143.
 Frantz Grenet: "Contribution à l'étude de la révolte de Muqanna' (c. 775-780): traces matérielles, traces hérésiographiques" in  Mohammad Ali Amir-Moezzi (ed.): Islam: identité et altérité ; hommage à Guy Monnot. Turnhout: Brepols 2013. S. 247-261.
 Boris Kochnev: "Les monnaies de Muqanna" in Studia Iranica 30 (2001) 143-50.
 Wilferd Madelung, Paul Ernest Walker: An Ismaili heresiography. The "Bāb al-shayṭān" from Abū Tammām’s Kitāb al-shajara. Brill, 1998.
 Svatopluk Soucek: A history of inner Asia. Cambridge University Press, 2000.

External links 
 Encyclopaedia Iranica, MOQANNAʿ, (lit. “the veiled one,” d. 163/780 or later), leader of a rebellious movement in Sogdiana.
 Veiled Prophet of Khorasan - a historical study from many sources, includes original texts

People from Merv
8th-century Iranian people
Iranian prophets
Iranian religious leaders
Year of birth unknown
Khurasan under the Abbasid Caliphate
Year of death unknown
Rebels from the Abbasid Caliphate
Khurramites
8th-century people from the Abbasid Caliphate
783 deaths